Nikolay Andreyevich Tyrsa (1887-10 February 1942) was a Russian painter. Nikolay Punin admired his work, in 1916 describing it as "organic, powerful and steady art; art, which we have been long waiting for, which we called for – the way to the art of the future."

From 1905 to 1909 Tyrsa studied under Léon Bakst at the St. Petersburg Academy of Arts.

During the siege of Leningrad Tyrsa became seriously ill and was evacuated to Vologda on 29 January 1942. He died there several days later.

References

1887 births
1942 deaths
20th-century Russian painters
Victims of the Siege of Leningrad